Albert Dorca Masó (born 23 December 1982) is a Spanish professional footballer who plays as a central midfielder.

Club career
Born in Olot, Girona, Catalonia, Dorca played 418 Segunda División matches as a professional after spending his youth career at FC Barcelona. He represented Girona FC, Racing de Santander, Real Murcia, Real Zaragoza, Elche CF and AD Alcorcón.

Dorca made his debut in the competition on 30 August 2008 as a Girona player, featuring 90 minutes in the 1–0 away win against RC Celta de Vigo. In the 2017–18 season he scored a career-best seven goals to help Alcorcón finish in 13th position and, one month shy of his 36th birthday, renewed his contract until 30 June 2020.

Personal life
Dorca majored in industrial engineering at the Polytechnic University of Catalonia. In 2016, he became the father of twin daughters.

References

External links
 
 
 
 
 

1982 births
Living people
People from Olot
Sportspeople from the Province of Girona
Spanish footballers
Footballers from Catalonia
Association football midfielders
Segunda División players
Segunda División B players
Tercera División players
Primera Federación players
FC Barcelona C players
Palamós CF footballers
Girona FC players
Racing de Santander players
Real Murcia players
Real Zaragoza players
Elche CF players
AD Alcorcón footballers
UE Cornellà players